Sūr Saxwan ("Banquet Speech") is a Middle Persian document regarding a court banquet that took place in Sasanian Iran. The reference of four generals (spahbeds), the four frontier regions established with the military reforms of king (shah) Kavad I and his son Khosrow I, indicates that the document was made between the 6th and the 7th centuries.

References

Sources 
 

Middle Persian
Zoroastrian texts
Sasanian Empire